Sławomir Jan Piechota (born 1 January 1960 in Tomaszów Mazowiecki) is a Polish politician. He was elected to the Sejm on 25 September 2005, getting 7,281 votes in 3 Wrocław district as a candidate from the Civic Platform list.

See also
Members of Polish Sejm 2005-2007

References

External links
Sławomir Jan Piechota - parliamentary page - includes declarations of interest, voting record, and transcripts of speeches.

Members of the Polish Sejm 2005–2007
Civic Platform politicians
Politicians with disabilities
1960 births
People from Tomaszów Mazowiecki
Living people
Members of the Polish Sejm 2007–2011
Members of the Polish Sejm 2011–2015
Members of the Polish Sejm 2015–2019
Members of the Polish Sejm 2019–2023